The 144th Massachusetts General Court, consisting of the Massachusetts Senate and the Massachusetts House of Representatives, met in 1925 and 1926.

Senators

Representatives

See also
 1926 Massachusetts gubernatorial election
 69th United States Congress
 List of Massachusetts General Courts

References

Further reading

External links

 
 
 
 

Political history of Massachusetts
Massachusetts legislative sessions
massachusetts
1925 in Massachusetts
massachusetts
1926 in Massachusetts